Sonia Amelio (born Mexico City, Mexico, 1941) is a Mexican dancer, musician, choreographer, and actress.  She is notable and well-known as a castanet player and arranger.

Amelio was on stage as a pianist and ballerina from age six.  She was trained in dance, both classical ballet and traditional Spanish and Latin American styles.  For the latter, she often utilized castanets. Amelio has developed castanet arrangements to accompany works of such composers as Chopin and Liszt, and has performed them as a guest artist with orchestras in several countries, including the city symphonies of Novosibirsk, Russia and Reutlingen, Germany.  She has also developed dance routines to accompany the works of romantic era composers such as Beethoven and Paganini.

Amelio appeared as a dramatic actress in a number of films and television programs in her native Mexico during the 1960s and 1970s.  Her one appearance in a Hollywood film was a small part in director Sam Peckinpah’s The Wild Bunch (1969).  She portrays a young Mexican woman named Teresa who is shot to death by a lover in a public square after scorning him for another man.

Much of her recent career has been devoted to musical education.  She has conducted seminars and master classes on dance and choreography outside Mexico.  Her institutional affiliations have included the Choreographic Institute of Beijing and the Ana Pavlova Institute in Moscow.

Partial filmography
Los tres calaveras (1965) - Herself
A Faithful Soldier of Pancho Villa (1967) - María Dolores
The Wild Bunch (1969) - Teresa
El crepúsculo de un dios (1969) - Angela Baretti / Sonia Amelio
Remolino de pasiones (1970) - Dancer
The Fearmaker (1971) - Linda
Tacos al carbón (1972) - Leonor
Mi niño Tizoc (1972) - Raquel, enfermera
Me caí de la nube (1974) - Emma
Los 7 pecados capitales (1975)
Los tres compadres (1975)
Nobleza ranchera (1977)
De Cocula es el mariachi (1978) - (final film role)

External links

 
Sonia Amelio Official Website (In Spanish)

1941 births
Living people
Castanets players
20th-century Mexican actresses
Mexican choreographers
Mexican female dancers
Mexican musicians